Jatinga (Pron: ʤʌˈtɪŋgə or ʤæˈtɪŋgə ), a village on a ridge, is located in Dima Hasao district, Assam, India.

Jatinga, Assam has been referred to as one of the “10 Most Mysterious places in India”, and is also called the Bermuda Triangle for Birds.

Mysterious Bird deaths 

At the end of the monsoon months especially on moonless and foggy dark nights between 6 p.m. and 9:30 p.m usually in the months of September and October, birds are not disturbed by the locals but out of the dark northern skies will start to descend as they are attracted to lights. These dazed birds are captured using bamboo poles by the locals. The local tribals first took this natural phenomenon to be spirits flying from the sky to terrorize them. This phenomenon is not confined to a single species, with tiger bittern, black bittern, little egret, pond heron, Indian pitta, and kingfishers all being affected, as well as hill partridge, green pigeon, emerald dove, necklaced laughingthrush, black drongo. The birds are mostly juvenile, according to Assam's best known ornithologist, Anwaruddin Choudhury.

The late naturalist E. P. Gee brought this phenomenon to global attention in the 1960s. He drove to Jatinga with famed ornithologist late Salim Ali. The cause of it is likely to be disorientation at high altitudes and high speed winds due to the widespread fog characteristic at the time. The zoological survey of India sent Sudhir Sengupta to unravel this mystery. The most recent description of the phenomenon and its comparison with similar incidents elsewhere in Malaysia, Philippines, and Mizoram is found in the book The Birds of Assam by Anwaruddin Choudhury. He concluded that the birds, mostly juveniles and local migrants, are disturbed by high velocity winds at their roost. When the disturbed birds fly towards lights as refuge they are hit with bamboo poles and killed or injured.

Conservation groups and wildlife officials in India have taken steps to prevent wanton killing of birds across India. Bikash Brahma, Additional Principal Chief Conservator of Forests of Dima Hasao, stated the killings as well as the number of birds arriving at the village has been declining gradually since the last few years. Much of this is due to loss of habitat caused by "development and environment degradation".

See also 
 Dima Hasao district
 Kaziranga National Park
 Tourism in Assam

References 

Dima Hasao district
Villages in Dima Hasao district
Ornithology
Tourism in Assam
Tourism in Northeast India
Earth mysteries
Tourism by city